Ivan Kirev (born 12 December 1998) is a Bulgarian footballer who plays as a midfielder for Borislav Parvomay.

Career
On 11 September 2016, Kirev made his professional debut for Botev Plovdiv in a 1–2 away defeat by Pirin Blagoevgrad, coming on as substitute for Serkan Yusein.  On 16 June 2017, he was loaned to Maritsa Plovdiv but returned to his parent club before the beginning of the season. A few days later, he was loaned to Bansko.

References

External links

Living people
1998 births
Bulgarian footballers
Bulgaria youth international footballers
Association football midfielders
Botev Plovdiv players
FC Bansko players
FC Pirin Razlog players
PFC Spartak Varna players
First Professional Football League (Bulgaria) players
People from Gotse Delchev
Sportspeople from Blagoevgrad Province
21st-century Bulgarian people